David Finlay Jr. (born 31 January 1958) is a Northern Irish retired professional wrestler currently signed to WWE as a trainer/assistant coach. He is known for his work with World Championship Wrestling (WCW) under the ring name Fit Finlay from 1995 to 2000, and Finlay in World Wrestling Entertainment (WWE) from 2005 to 2010. 

Debuted in 1974, Finlay has held over 20 championships around the world throughout his career, including the WCW World Television Championship and the WWE United States Championship.

Professional wrestling career

British and European Wrestling (1974–1995)
Finlay's first match was for his father's promotion in Glynn in 1974, when he filled in for a wrestler who no-showed. He began wrestling on a full-time basis in Carrickfergus and throughout Northern Ireland and the Republic of Ireland for the next four years before moving to England in 1978. In England, he wrestled for various companies under the Joint Promotions banner. Finlay defeated Alan Kilby on 9 June 1982 to win his first title, the Joint Promotions British Heavy Middleweight Championship. At this time, Finlay's then-wife, "Princess" Paula Valdez, became his manager.

He then won a tournament to crown a new British Light Heavyweight champion and fill the vacant position, defeating Ringo Rigby in the finals. Finlay soon lost the championship, but later pinned Marty Jones to win the World Mid-Heavyweight Championship. He traded it back and forth with Jones for over two years before losing it a final time to Jones via disqualification. He defeated Jones to win Joint Promotions' British Light Heavyweight Championship. In the second half of the 1980s, he defeated Frank 'Chic' Cullen on television for the British Heavy Middleweight Championship, but later lost it to Danny Collins. In 1990 he became a champion at the top of the weight range when he won All Star's British Heavyweight Championship. Finlay often competed on ITV's World of Sport programme as Dave "Fit" Finlay and had many matches against "The American Dream" Steve Adonis.

During this time, Finlay also began to wrestle in Japan, then in Germany and Austria for the European promotion Catch Wrestling Association. While holding the British Heavyweight championship, he teamed with former rival Jones to win the CWA tag title from Tony St. Clair and Mile Zrno. After losing the British championship to Dave Taylor, Finlay began to focus more on the CWA, winning many of their championships.

Finlay teamed with Mark Rocco and Skull Murphy (Peter Northey) in a 1989 WWF dark match in London, defeating the team of Al Perez, Dusty Wolfe, and Tim Horner.

World Championship Wrestling (1996–2001)

The Belfast Bruiser (1996) 
Finlay made his American wrestling debut in World Championship Wrestling (WCW) in 1996, going by the ring name of The Belfast Bruiser. Finlay made his WCW debut on 27 January episode of Saturday Night by emerging from the stands to viciously attack Lord Steven Regal and then cut a promo to the camera in which he introduced himself and declared that Regal was an "English pig" who was "paying for 400 years" of English-Irish conflict. This marked the beginning of a lengthy feud between the Bruiser and Regal. Bruiser won his first match in WCW on 10 February episode of Saturday Night by defeating enhancement talent Mike Marcello. The feud played out over subsequent Saturday Night episodes in which the Bruiser and Regal's stablemates The Blue Bloods (Squire David Taylor and Earl Robert Eaton) interfered in each other's matches. The Bruiser won a stiff encounter with Regal by disqualification at Uncensored when the Blue Bloods again rushed the ring and assaulted him after Regal suffered a broken nose during the match. The following night on Monday Nitro, Bruiser suffered his first loss in WCW against Randy Savage. 

After Regal pinned the Bruiser in a parking lot brawl on 29 April episode of Monday Nitro, the feud died down thereafter. The injuries sustained from the match would lead to Bruiser being removed from his scheduled tag team match with Regal at Slamboree. Finlay would then take a hiatus off WCW television for a stint in Catch Wrestling Association, while abandoning the Belfast Bruiser persona in the process.

World Television Champion (1997–1998) 
Finlay returned to WCW on 1 October 1997 by defeating Dave Taylor at a live event. He made his televised return on 25 October episode of Saturday Night as Fit Finlay, sporting a new look of short bleached-blond hair and no mustache. He defeated Barry Houston in his televised return match. He participated in the World War 3 battle royal at the namesake event on 23 November for a future WCW World Heavyweight Championship title shot, but failed to win the match. 

He was given a push upon his return winning majority of his matches in the mid-card, which culminated in him pinning Booker T to win the World Television Championship on 4 May 1998 episode of Nitro, thus setting off a three-way feud with Booker and Chris Benoit, who was also vying for the title. Finlay retained the title against Benoit at Slamboree. Finlay also regularly defended the title on weekly WCW television against the likes of Chavo Guerrero Jr., Kaos, The Renegade, Brad Armstrong, Jim Neidhart, Norman Smiley and Psychosis, before losing the World Television Championship back to Booker T at The Great American Bash. Finlay unsuccessfully challenged Booker for the title in a rematch on 2 July episode of Thunder. He received another title shot for the title against Chris Jericho on 17 October episode of Saturday Night but the match ended in a time limit draw.

Shortly after his title loss, Finlay began feuding with Alex Wright, who was angry at Finlay for having ended the wrestling career of his father, Steve Wright, which led to a match between the two at Halloween Havoc, where Finlay was pinned by Wright. However, Finlay defeated Wright in a rematch on 29 October episode of Thunder. Finlay would then team with WCW colleague Jerry Flynn to participate in New Japan Pro Wrestling's Super Grade Tag League, with their team losing all of their matches in the tournament and coming in last place. He returned from the tour of NJPW in December and then teamed with Flynn against Brian Adams and Scott Norton in a losing effort at Starrcade.

The Hardcore Army (1999–2001)
After defeating Van Hammer at the Souled Out pay-per-view on 17 January 1999, Finlay was randomly paired with Dave Taylor to participate in a tournament for the vacant World Tag Team Championship, where they lost to The Faces of Fear in a lumberjack match in the opening round, thus moving to the Losers' Bracket, where they defeated Billy Kidman and Chavo Guerrero, Jr. in the opening round but lost to Chris Benoit and Dean Malenko in the second round. On 10 June episode of Thunder, Finlay unsuccessfully challenged Rick Steiner for the World Television Championship. In the summer of 1999, Finlay resumed his alliance with Taylor which also expanded to include former rival Steven Regal but the trio did not achieve much success. During that time, Finlay began competing in the emerging hardcore division. At Bash at the Beach, he won a Junkyard Invitational involving Ciclope, Jerry Flynn, Johnny Grunge, Hak, Horace Hogan, Brian Knobs, Hugh Morrus, La Parka, Steve Regal, Rocco Rock, Silver King, Dave Taylor, and Mikey Whipwreck, winning a "hardcore trophy". 

He legitimately suffered a badly lacerated nerve in his leg during a hardcore match at a house show in Jackson, Mississippi on 25 July 1999, which nearly cost him use of the leg. As he was wrestling Brian Knobbs, he was thrown into a table in the corner of the ring, causing it to shatter and the shards to cut into his leg. He managed to regain use of the limb and would return to WCW at Starrcade by assisting Knobbs in interfering in Norman Smiley's Hardcore Championship title defense against Meng. Finlay unsuccessfully challenged Smiley for the Hardcore Championship on 23 December episode of Thunder. In his continued pursuit of the Hardcore Championship, Finlay began regularly teaming with Knobbs as well. At the 2000 Souled Out event, Finlay unsuccessfully challenged Knobbs for the Hardcore Championship in a four-way match, also involving Smiley and Meng.

Shortly after, Finlay formed a trio of the "Hardcore Army" with Knobbs and The Dog as they defeated 3 Count in a hardcore match on 1 March episode of Thunder. They feuded with Vampiro leading to a falls count anywhere match between Finlay and Vampiro at Uncensored, which Finlay lost. Finlay left wrestling in the summer of 2000 and accepted the position of a backstage road agent for WCW. His final match in WCW was at Millennium Final, where he competed twice, firstly in a battle royal and secondly in an Octoberfest Hardcore match against Norman Smiley in a losing effort. Finlay remained in the company as a road agent until WCW was bought by the World Wrestling Federation (WWF) in 2001.

World Wrestling Federation/Entertainment (2001–2011)

Trainer (2001–2005) 
When WCW was purchased by the World Wrestling Federation (WWF; now WWE), Finlay began working for the company as a trainer for new wrestlers. He trained future WWE champions John Cena and Randy Orton and was eventually put in charge of training the WWE Divas for their matches.

In-ring return and United States Champion (2005–2006) 
Finlay began working on a comeback in 2004, wrestling in a match against Jamie Noble at a house show in Glasgow, and promos began airing for his impending in-ring return on 30 December 2005. His gimmick was that of a proud native Irishman who loved to fight. At the age of 47, Finlay made his televised debut on the 20 January 2006 edition of SmackDown! against Matt Hardy, which ended in a disqualification after he refused to break a five-count while pummelling Hardy against the ropes. After the match, Finlay stomped Hardy's face into the ring steps, establishing himself as a villain. This earned him the nickname "The Fighting Irish Bastard".

Finlay continued to establish himself on the SmackDown! roster. During February and March 2006, he feuded with Bobby Lashley that began after he cost Lashley his unbeaten streak by interfering in Lashley's match with JBL at No Way Out. This feud would see the pair brawl on many occasions, including a parking lot segment in which Lashley tried to overturn a car onto Finlay. Later, the pair competed in a Money in the Bank qualifier lumberjack match that Finlay won. During this time, Finlay began to wield a shillelagh as a weapon. On 2 April, Finlay competed at his first WrestleMania, WrestleMania 22. He faced five other WWE superstars from both the Raw and SmackDown! brands in a Money in the Bank ladder match which also included Lashley, who won a last chance battle royal. This match was eventually won by Rob Van Dam. Finlay next entered the King of the Ring tournament on SmackDown!, defeating his first round opponent Chris Benoit before being beaten by his rival Lashley, who advanced to the finals at Judgment Day. Finlay helped the other finalist, Booker T, defeat Lashley in the King of the Ring finals. At the same pay-per-view, Finlay lost to Chris Benoit.

Beginning on the 26 May episode of SmackDown!, Finlay was joined by Hornswoggle, who came out from under the ring to attack Finlay's opponents. Finlay then joined forces with William Regal as loyal subjects of the newly renamed King Booker and his Court. Both men were later "knighted" by the King, and Finlay briefly used the name Sir Finlay. During his time as part of the court, Finlay picked up a win against World Heavyweight Champion Rey Mysterio in a non-title match before defeating the court's main foe Bobby Lashley to take Lashley's United States Championship. Finlay defended the championship on several occasions, often with help from Little Bastard, and even defended it against fellow court member William Regal at The Great American Bash. He lost the title to Mr. Kennedy on the 1 September edition of SmackDown! in a Triple Threat match that also involved Bobby Lashley. After the title loss, Finlay continued to attack and wrestle threats to court leader Booker and his newly won World Heavyweight Championship, including Lashley and Batista. Finlay defeated Booker in a non-title singles match and lost in a four-way match at No Mercy for the title. After leaving the court, Finlay continued to feud with Batista. At Armageddon, Finlay and King Booker faced Batista and his partner, the WWE Champion John Cena from Raw but were defeated.

Alliance with Hornswoggle (2007–2009) 

Shortly after the Royal Rumble, Finlay began a feud with The Boogeyman. At No Way Out, he and Little Bastard defeated The Boogeyman and The Little Boogeyman. Finlay earned a place in the Money in the Bank ladder match at WrestleMania 23; however, Mr. Kennedy won the match. Following this loss, he would feud with Kennedy, after an attack on Little Bastard (now renamed "Hornswoggle") during the Money in the Bank match, and Jamie Noble for assaulting Hornswoggle after he won the Cruiserweight Championship. Finlay's feud, however, would quickly redirect to Kane after Finlay accidentally spilled coffee on him. The two also became involved with Batista and The Great Khali. At Saturday Night's Main Event XXXV, he and Khali lost to Batista and Kane. Kane beat him at SummerSlam. Finlay defeated Kane in a Belfast Brawl rematch a few weeks later.

Finlay and Hornswoggle briefly separated when Hornswoggle was stripped of the Cruiserweight Title, and briefly moving to Raw with his "illegitimate father". Finlay then feuded with Rey Mysterio by attacking him during a confrontational interview with John "Bradshaw" Layfield (JBL). At No Mercy, Finlay faked an injury after taking a bump to the outside. Once placed on a stretcher, Finlay suddenly rose and attacked Mysterio, forcing Rey to be carried out on the stretcher. The feud continued at Cyber Sunday, where fans voted for the two to face-off in a Stretcher match. Mysterio came out on top, but Finlay retaliated with a victory on the edition of 9 November of SmackDown! The feud intensified further when the two faced on opposite teams at Survivor Series.

Finlay reunited with Hornswoggle by coming to rescue him in a match against The Great Khali, turning both Finlay and Hornswoggle faces. At Armageddon, Finlay was placed in a match with Khali. Finlay scored an upset win after Hornswoggle interfered by hitting Khali in the groin with a shillelagh. Still battling Khali and his translator, Ranjin Singh, with Hornswoggle, he qualified for the Royal Rumble. He drew number 27, but was immediately disqualified when he entered before his time to save Hornswoggle. Hornswoggle, who was also a competitor in the Rumble, was disqualified as well. Finlay fought in the SmackDown Elimination Chamber match at No Way Out, ultimately being pinned after a chokeslam on the steel floor by The Undertaker.

Finlay then began making occasional appearances on Raw to protect Hornswoggle from Mr. McMahon, who had been showing him "tough love". After Hornswoggle was injured by JBL in a steel cage match, JBL revealed that Finlay, and not McMahon, was Hornswoggle's father. A week after, on 3 March, Finlay admitted to this fact. At WrestleMania XXIV he was defeated by JBL in a Belfast Brawl, where Hornswoggle also reappeared.

As part of the 2008 WWE supplemental draft, Finlay was drafted to the ECW brand. He and Hornswoggle challenged The Miz and John Morrison for the WWE Tag Team Championship at Night of Champions, but lost. Throughout the rest of 2008, Finlay challenged for the ECW Championship. He, along with Matt Hardy, Chavo Guerrero, The Miz and ECW Champion Mark Henry participated in the first ever Championship Scramble match at Unforgiven which Matt Hardy won. He defeated Mark Henry on an episode of ECW to earn an opportunity for the ECW championship, but was defeated by champion Matt Hardy. Then he started a feud with Henry, and the feud ended when Finlay defeated Henry in a Belfast Brawl match at Armageddon.

Brand switches and departure (2009–2011) 
Finlay entered his third Royal Rumble match at the eponymous pay-per-view on 25 January 2009, where he entered at number 14 and lasted 30 minutes before being eliminated by Kane. At No Way Out, Finlay faced Jack Swagger for the ECW Championship in a losing effort. On 13 March episode of SmackDown, Finlay defeated The Brian Kendrick to qualify for the Money in the Bank ladder match at WrestleMania 25. At the event, Finlay failed to win the match as it was won by CM Punk. In the 2009 Supplemental Draft, Finlay and Hornswoggle were separated when Hornswoggle was drafted to Raw. In late May 2009, Finlay suffered a legitimate eye injury, sidelining him temporarily. He returned on 16 June, attacking ECW Champion Tommy Dreamer, Christian, and Jack Swagger. At The Bash, he participated in a Championship Scramble match for the ECW Championship, which also included Christian, Jack Swagger and Mark Henry, however the defending champion Tommy Dreamer retained. Finlay did not return to ECW after that.

He was traded to the SmackDown brand on 29 June 2009. He went on to form part of John Morrison's team at Survivor Series, but was eliminated by Sheamus, and his team eventually lost. In late 2009, he began pursuing the Intercontinental Championship by feuding with Drew McIntyre, which he failed to win. His final televised match in WWE was on 4 June 2010 episode of SmackDown where he competed in a 15-man battle royal. He failed to win as the match was won by former rival Rey Mysterio. In 2010, Finlay became a full-time trainer and agent.

Finlay was released by WWE in March 2011 after authorising the interruption of the US national anthem by The Miz during a house show, which offended many, including National Guard members who were in attendance. Finlay stated that his intention was to intensify the audience's dislike of The Miz in preparation for the latter's WrestleMania XXVII main event appearance, but accepted full responsibility for his dismissal.

Independent circuit and retirement (2011–2012) 

After being released from WWE, Finlay was contacted by Total Nonstop Action Wrestling several times, but was unable to agree upon contractual terms. He began to wrestle again on the independent circuit, making his first appearance on 26 July 2011, defeating Sami Callihan at Evolve 9.

On 20 August 2011, Finlay made his debut for Pro Wrestling Guerrilla, taking part in the 2011 Battle of Los Angeles tournament. He was eliminated from the tournament in the first round by PWG World Champion Kevin Steen.

On 28 October 2011, Finlay's debut for Yoshihiro Tajiri's Smash promotion was announced, when he was revealed as the mysterious "King of Terror", Michael Kovac had promised to bring to the promotion and named first ever Smash Champion StarBuck's first challenger for the title. On 24 November at Smash.23, Finlay defeated StarBuck to become the new Smash Champion. On 19 February, Finlay made his first successful defence of the Smash Championship, defeating TAJIRI. Prior to the event, Smash had announced that it would cease its operations on 14 March, which led to Finlay vacating the Smash Championship after the title defence.

On 6 November 2011, Finlay wrestled in the main event of a Stampede Wrestling show in Barrie, Ontario in a losing effort against Harry Smith.

On 21 January 2012, Fit Finlay returned to DOA Pro Wrestling in Portland, OR to face Ethan H. D. for the DOA Heavyweight Championship.

On 12 May 2012, at Border Wars, Finlay made his debut for Ring of Honor (ROH), unsuccessfully challenging Roderick Strong for the ROH World Television Championship. On 24 May, Finlay made his debut for Wrestling New Classic (WNC), the follow-up promotion to Smash, defeating Akira in the main event. Two days later, Finlay defeated Zeus in the main event of another WNC event. Finlay's first tour of WNC concluded on 27 May, when he, Akira and Syuri defeated Kana, Mikey Whipwreck and Tajiri in a six-person main event. On 24 June at ROH's Best in the World 2012: Hostage Crisis iPPV, Finlay was defeated by Michael Elgin.

Finlay returned to WNC on 20 September, when he defeated Ray Mendoza, Jr. in the main event at Korakuen Hall. Following the match, Finlay announced that he was done with WNC for the time being due to re-signing with WWE. Despite no longer scheduled to make appearances for WNC, Finlay was named the head of the WNC Championship Committee.

Return to WWE (2012–present)
Following a stint on the independent circuit and a year after the house show incident, Finlay returned to WWE on  11 July 2012 as a backstage producer. The two sides had been negotiating since WrestleMania XXVIII, but there were situations that delayed the deal being finalised. During the following years, Finlay made some cameo appearances, usually separating brawling wrestlers. He was also one of four wrestlers who presented Tyler Bate with the WWE UK Championship after Bate won the related tournament in January 2017. After Lana was unable to compete in the 2019 women's Royal Rumble match following an attack by Nia Jax during her entrance, Finlay gave fellow Irish wrestler Becky Lynch permission to replace Lana; Lynch would go on to win the match and subsequently headline WrestleMania 35, where she would win both the Raw Women's Championship and SmackDown Women's Championship in a Winner Takes All triple threat match against Ronda Rousey and Charlotte Flair.

On 16 April 2020, Finlay was among the several WWE employees who were furloughed as part of the COVID-19 budget cuts but returned to work in November of the same year. In November, he was re-hired as a trainer and assistant coach at the WWE Performance Center in Orlando, Florida.

Legacy
Finlay has received praise from fellow professional wrestlers and peers. He reportedly assisted in the transition of WWE's presentation of the WWE Divas from bra and panties matches to more respectful traditional wrestling. Former WWE Diva Victoria attested: "He made us and molded us. He got to know what made us tick, exposed that, and there was nothing we couldn't do. Today, the girls pick and choose what moves they want to do. If Fit Finlay wasn't around, that wouldn't happen. We worked stiff. We made contact."

Other women wrestlers such as Torrie Wilson, Lita, Jazz, Stacy Keibler, Molly Holly, The Bella Twins, Beth Phoenix, Natalya, Trish Stratus, Ruby Riott, Liv Morgan, Sarah Logan, Sasha Banks, Charlotte Flair, Becky Lynch, Lana, Bayley, and Ronda Rousey have credited Finlay for helping them hone their wrestling abilities and find their identities. They described Finlay as "an incredible wrestler and patient coach who treats everyone equally and brings out the best in them".

WWE Hall of Famer Batista has credited Finlay as "the unsung hero who changed the direction of his career" and personally requested Finlay to induct him in the Hall of Fame ceremony. Former WWE wrestler and trainer Lance Storm and former AEW wrestler and executive Cody Rhodes have also praised Finlay's mentoring skills and for putting new talents over.

Other media

Video games 
{| class="wikitable sortable"
! Year
! Title
! Gimmick
! Notes
|-
|1998
| WCW/nWo Revenge
|Fit Finlay
|Video game debut
|-
|1999
|WCW/nWo Thunder|Fit Finlay
|
|-
|1999
| WCW Nitro|Fit Finlay
| Last WCW video game
|-
|2006
|WWE SmackDown vs. Raw 2007|Finlay
| First WWE video game
|-
|2007
|WWE SmackDown vs. Raw 2008|Finlay
|
|-
|2008
|WWE SmackDown vs. Raw 2009|Finlay
|
|-
|2009
|WWE SmackDown vs. Raw 2010|Finlay
|
|-
|2010
|WWE SmackDown vs. Raw 2011|Finlay
|
|-
|2014
|WWE SuperCard|Fit Finlay
|Mobile game
|-
|2014
|WWE 2K15|Fit Finlay
|Downloadable content (DLC)
|-
|2015
|WWE 2K16|Fit Finlay
|Last video game appearance
|}

 Personal life 
Both Finlay's father, David "Dave" Finlay Sr., and his grandfather were professional wrestlers, and his sister was a referee. His uncle, Albert, was a goalkeeper for Glentoran FC in the 1960s and 1970s. Finlay was previously married to his former manager, Princess Paula. He is currently married to Melanie (Mel) Duffin and has three children, the eldest of whom, David, was born in Germany.

His children are all wrestlers. The oldest, David, made his professional wrestling debut on 22 December 2012 and is now wrestling for New Japan Pro Wrestling (NJPW) and Ring of Honor (ROH). David is a former IWGP Heavyweight Tag Team Champion. His daughter has won the Georgia State championship. The family resides in Loughgeorge, County  Galway, Ireland.

 Championships and accomplishments 
 All Star Wrestling
 British Heavyweight Championship (1 time)
World Middleweight Championship (1 time)
 Catch Wrestling Association
CWA British Commonwealth Championship (1 time)
 CWA Intercontinental Heavyweight Championship (1 time)
 CWA World Middleweight Championship (4 times)
 CWA World Tag Team Championship (1 time) – with Marty Jones
 Fighting Spirit Magazine LL Cool J Award (2006)
 Joint Promotions
 World Mid-Heavyweight Championship (4 times)
 British Heavy Middleweight Championship (6 times)
 British Light Heavyweight Championship (2 times)
 World of Sport Top Tag Team Tournament 1982 (with Skull Murphy (Peter Northey) as the Riot Squad.)TV Times 27 November - 3 December 1982, ITV listings for Saturday 27 November 1982, panel for World of Sport
 Pro Wrestling Illustrated Ranked No. 33 of the top 500 singles wrestlers in the PWI 500'' in 2007
 Ranked No. 278 of the top 500 singles wrestlers of the "PWI Years" in 2003
 Smash
 Smash Championship (1 time)
 World Championship Wrestling
 WCW World Television Championship (1 time)
 Hardcore Junkyard Invitational Tournament (1999)
 World Wrestling Entertainment
 WWE United States Championship (1 time)
 Bragging Rights Trophy (2009) – with Team SmackDown (Chris Jericho, Kane, R-Truth, Matt Hardy, David Hart Smith and Tyson Kidd)

Notes

References

External links 

Dave "Fit" Finlay Interview

1958 births
Expatriate sportspeople from Northern Ireland in the United States
Living people
Male professional wrestlers from Northern Ireland
NWA/WCW World Television Champions
NWA/WCW/WWE United States Heavyweight Champions
People from Carrickfergus
Professional wrestling executives
Professional wrestling managers and valets
Professional wrestling trainers
Sportspeople from Belfast
Ulster Scots people
20th-century professional wrestlers
21st-century professional wrestlers